Denis Aleksandrovich Matyugin (born 28 May 1992) is a former Russian football forward.

Club career
He made his debut in the Russian Second Division for FC Gornyak Uchaly on 24 April 2011 in a game against FC Khimik Dzerzhinsk.

He made his Russian Football National League debut for FC Ural Sverdlovsk Oblast on 29 April 2012 in a game against FC Torpedo Moscow.

References

External links
 

1992 births
Place of birth missing (living people)
Living people
Russian footballers
Association football forwards
FC Gornyak Uchaly players
FC Ural Yekaterinburg players